The All-Union Central Executive Committee was the most authoritative governing body of the USSR during the interims of the sessions of the All-Union Congress of Soviets. Established in 1922 by the First All-Union Congress of Soviets (see Treaty on the Creation of the USSR), in 1938 it was replaced by the Presidium of the Supreme Soviet of first convocation.

Initially the Committee consisted of four members, after 1925 there were seven. The Kazakh and Kirghiz SSRs were created in 1936 and did not have representatives in the Committee, as it dissolved just two years later.

Description 
The Central Executive Committee was created with adoption of the Treaty on the Creation of the USSR in December of 1922. The Central Executive Committee was elected by the Congress of Soviet to govern on its behalf whenever the Congress of Soviets was not in session. The Central Executive Committee was convened by the Presidium of the Central Executive Committee, which was elected by the Central Executive Committee to govern on its behalf whenever it was not in session.

By the 1924 Soviet Constitution, the Central Executive Committee comprised two chambers: the Soviet of the Union (delegates elected broadly) and the Soviet of Nationalities (delegates elected regionally). At the constituent republic level there operated a Central Executive Committee in each of the federal republics:

 the All-Russian Central Executive Committee in the RSFSR
 the All-Byelorussian Central Executive Committee in the Byelorussian SSR
 the All-Ukrainian Central Executive Committee in the Ukrainian SSR
 the All-Caucasian Central Executive Committee of the Transacaucasian SFSR

Leadership

Chairmen 

The Presidium of the Central Executive Committee consisted of 21 members and included the Presidia of the Soviet of the Union and the Soviet of Nationalities. A representative of each constituent republic (initially four) was elected one of the directors of the presidium.

Russian Soviet Federative Socialist Republic: Mikhail Kalinin (December 30, 1922 – January 12, 1938)
Ukrainian Soviet Socialist Republic: Grigory Petrovsky (December 30, 1922 – January 12, 1938)
Byelorussian Soviet Socialist Republic: Alexander Chervyakov (December 30, 1922 – June 16, 1937)
Transcaucasian Socialist Federative Soviet Republic:
Nariman Narimanov (December 30, 1922 – March 19, 1925)
Gazanfar Musabekov (May 21, 1925 – June 1937)

As more entities (usually previously Autonomous Soviet Socialist Republics) were promoted to the status of constituent republics of the USSR, they received representation among the directors of the Presidium:
Uzbek Soviet Socialist Republic (from 1924): Fayzulla Khodzhayev (May 21, 1925 – June 17, 1937)
Turkmen Soviet Socialist Republic (from 1925): Nedirbay Aytakov (May 21, 1925 – 21 July 1937)
Tajik Soviet Socialist Republic (from 1929):
Nusratullo Maksum (March 18, 1931 – January 4, 1934)
Abdullo Rakhimbayev (January 4, 1934 – September 1937)

Presidium secretaries 
 1922–1935 Avel Yenukidze
 1935–1937 Ivan Akulov
 1937–1938 Aleksandr Gorkin

Soviet of the Union chairmen

Soviet of Nationalities chairmen 
 Mykola Skrypnyk

Powers 
The 1924 Soviet Constitution defined the powers of the CEC as:
 Calling of the Congresses of Soviets
 Election of the Council of the People's Commissars (Sovnarkom)
 Adoption of decrees and legislative acts
 Legislative and administrative actions assigned to it

See also 
All-Union Congress of Soviets
All-Union Council on Physical Culture and Sports

Notes

References

External links 
 The highest organs of state power of the USSR (Высшие органы государственной власти СССР).

Government of the Soviet Union
Defunct bicameral legislatures
1922 establishments in the Soviet Union
1938 disestablishments in the Soviet Union
Collective heads of state